Jesús Iñigo Liceranzu Otxoa (13 March 1959) is a Spanish retired footballer who played as a defender, and a coach.

Club career
Born in Bilbao, Biscay, Liceranzu was a product of local giants Athletic Bilbao. After three years with the reserves he made his professional debut with Basque neighbours Barakaldo CF, in the second division.

Upon his return in the summer of 1981, Liceranzu eventually became an undisputed started for the club, partnering Andoni Goikoetxea as stopper and being dubbed Rocky due to his hard approach. In 1983–84, as Athletic renewed its domestic supremacy, he scored a career-best seven goals in 32 matches; on 29 April 1984, he found the net twice in a Basque Derby home win against Real Sociedad (his second meaning the final 2–1, and the club's 3000th goal in La Liga).

Liceranzu retired from football in 1989 at only 30, after one season with Elche CF also in the top level. Towards the end of the following decade he became a coach, working mainly in his native region: Úbeda CF, Zalla UC, SD Lemona, Amurrio Club, Barakaldo and Zamora CF.

International career
On 30 April 1985, Liceranzu earned his sole cap for Spain, playing the entire 1986 FIFA World Cup qualifier against Wales, a 0–3 loss in Wrexham.

Honours
Athletic Bilbao
La Liga: 1982–83, 1983–84
Copa del Rey: 1983–84
Supercopa de España: 1984

References

External links

1959 births
Living people
Spanish footballers
Footballers from Bilbao
Association football defenders
La Liga players
Segunda División players
Segunda División B players
Bilbao Athletic footballers
Athletic Bilbao footballers
Barakaldo CF footballers
Elche CF players
Spain youth international footballers
Spain international footballers
Spanish football managers
Segunda División B managers
SD Lemona managers
Barakaldo CF managers
Zamora CF managers